Noida Assembly constituency or Noida Vidhan Sabha is one of the 403 assembly constituencies of Uttar Pradesh state in the northern India. It consists of city Noida.
It is located in the Gautam Buddha Nagar district which has three assembly seats namely, Noida (61), Dadri (62) and Jewar (63). 

Noida falls under the Gautam Buddh Nagar Lok Sabha constituency. Pankaj Singh (son of Rajnath Singh) is the present MLA of Noida since March 2017.

Area/wards
The Noida Assembly constituency comprises Sorkha Jahidabad, Chhajarsi, Parthala Khanjarpur, Chotpur, Mamura, Gejha Tilpatabad, Chhalera Bangar, Jalpura, Sadarpur, Sultanpur, Baraula, Bhangel Begampur of Bisrakh block; and Noida.

Members of the Legislative Assembly (MLA)

1957-2008
See Dadri Assembly constituency.

2008-Present
Noida Assembly constituency was created in 2008 by carving out area from Dadri assembly constituency.

Election results

2022

2017

2014 by-election

2012

See also
 List of constituencies of the Uttar Pradesh Legislative Assembly
 Gautam Budh Nagar district

References

 http://www.elections.in/uttar-pradesh/assembly-constituencies/noida.html

External links
 

Assembly constituencies of Uttar Pradesh
Noida